R315 road may refer to:
 R315 road (Ireland)
 R315 road (South Africa)